The Intrigue is an oil on canvas painting created by Belgian expressionist painter James Ensor. This painting is in the possession of Royal Museum of Fine Arts Antwerp and is part of the official inventory of Flemish masterpieces.

The use of masks in Ensor's paintings is prevalent. The masks and the use of colours increase the expressive quality of the painting. The sharp contrast that is created through the use of pure colours on white canvas is a follow up on French impressionist traditions.

Description 

The painting consists of 11 figures who are all masked. In the centre of the painting, a woman is taking a man's hand with a triumphant smile. The masks are revealing the figures' characters instead of hiding them. In the right corner of the painting, a woman is holding a doll or a dead baby. The colourful bodies create a contrast with the white background.

This painting is labelled as "grotesque" and "a group portrait". This painting might still be considered as a realistic picture because of its few references to accurate depiction of the outside world, for instance the colour of the sky.

Source of inspiration 
Although Ensor is often categorised along with Vincent van Gogh and Edvard Munch as an expressionist artist, with The Intrigue he manifests his inclinations towards the path of Hieronymus Bosch and Pieter Brueghel the elder in drawing and creating bizarre images.

The story behind the painting is autobiographical and inspired by an actual event during Ensor's life. It depicts his sister's marriage with a Chinese art dealer from Berlin that caused a lot of scandals in Ensor's hometown.

References

External links
Lukas official website of artwork
RA Royal academy official website
 The Guardian official website

1911 paintings
Paintings in the collection of the Royal Museum of Fine Arts Antwerp
Paintings by James Ensor
Belgian art